Wada Vidhan Sabha constituency was one of the seats in Maharashtra Legislative Assembly in India. Wada is near Mumbai, Thane, and Palghar. The area under this seat is now mostly divided as a part of Bhiwandi Rural and Vikramgad Vidhan Sabha seats since 2008.

Vishnu Savara, who represented this Wada seat (विष्णु सावरा, वाडा मतदारसंघ) for close to 20 years, was later elected to Vidhan Sabha from Bhiwandi Rural Assembly constituency in 2009 and from Vikramgad seat in 2014.

Members of Vidhan Sabha 
 1952-1972: Seat did not exist
 1978 : Somnath Rama Wani (Janata Party)
 1980 : Gowari Shankar Aba (Indira Congress)
 1990 : Vishnu Savara (BJP)
 1995 : Vishnu Savara (BJP)
 1999 : Vishnu Ram Savara (BJP)
 2004 : Vishnu Savara (BJP)
 2009 onwards : Seat does not exist

Election Results

1978 Assembly Election
 Wani Somnath Rama (JNP) : 28,989 votes    
 Kale Shankar Ladku (INC) : 17047

1980 Assembly Election
 Gowari Shankar Aba (INC-Indira) : 16,874 votes    
 Sawara Vishnu Rama (BJP) : 14974

2004 Assembly Election
 Vishnu Rama Savara (BJP) : 77,351 votes  
 Suresh Haribhau Pawar (NCP) : 43261

See also 
 List of constituencies of Maharashtra Legislative Assembly

References 

Former assembly constituencies of Maharashtra